The RM-51 (Raketomet vzor 1951) multiple rocket launcher was a Czechoslovak Army alternative of the BM-13 multiple rocket launcher developed in the 1950s.

Variants 
 vz. 51 - Original model, based on Praga V3S 6×6 truck.
 M-51 - Export version used by Austria, based on Steyr 680 M3 6×6 truck.
 RM-51 - Export variant, based on ZIS-151 and ZIL-157 6×6 trucks.

Operators 
  - 18 delivered in 1974, designated M-51.
  - 24 delivered in 1963.
  - 6 in service as of 2021.
  - In 2012, Indonesian Army retrofitted their RM-51, including replacing the original Praga V3S truck with Reo M35A2 truck.
 
  - 20 delivered between 1965-1966.
  - 50 delivered between 1957-1958.
  - 36 delivered between 1976-1977.
  - 58 delivered between 1956-1965. Designated R-2, the launchers were later mounted on ZIL-157 trucks.

See also 
 RM-70 multiple rocket launcher - the successor of RM-51

References 

 Christopher Chant, A compendium of armaments and military hardware, Routledge, 1987, 
 Christopher F. Foss, Artillery of the World, 
 Franklin D. Margiotta, Brassey's encyclopedia of land forces and warfare, Brassey's, 1996, 
 Stroea, Adrian, col. conf. univ. dr., Băjenaru, Gheorghe, lt. col, Artileria română în date și imagini, Editura Centrului Tehnic-Editorial al Armatei, București, 2010,

External links 

 Description and photos in Slovak

Wheeled self-propelled rocket launchers
Multiple rocket launchers of Czechoslovakia
Self-propelled artillery of Czechoslovakia